is a Japanese manga artist who is best known for creating the romantic comedy shōjo manga High School Debut (Koukou Debut).
Kawahara has also published and authored several other manga series, most notably Ai no Tame ni and Aozora Yell, and mostly specialises in the genre of romance.

Works

Manga
Shiawase no Kanzume – 1 volume, 1993
Tensei   – 1 volume, 1993
Nakitaku Nattara Oshiete ne – 1 volume, 1995
500 Mile – 1 volume, 1996
Shuugaku Ryokou   – 1 volume, 1996
Sensei! – 20 volumes, 1996–2007 - adapted to a live action film My Teacher in 2017
Platinum Snow – 1 volume, 2000
Ai no Tame ni – 1 volume, 2002
High School Debut (Koukou Debut) – 13 volumes, 2003–2008 - adapted to a live action film in 2011
Aozora Yell – 19 volumes, 2008–2015 - adapted to a live action film in 2016
Enren Debut  – 2009 (oneshot, sequel of Koukou Debut)
Tomodachi no Hanashi – 1 volume, 2010
Ore Monogatari!! – 13 volumes, 2011–2016
Mayuge no Kakudo wa 45° de – 2013 (single chapter, crossover from "Aozora Yell" and "Kimi ni Todoke")
Suteki na Kareshi – 14 volumes, 2016–2020

Adaptation for comics
Muteki no Love Power – 1 volume, 2005
Kimi ga Sukida Kara!! – 1 volume, 2005
Koukou Debut – re-released, 8 volumes, 2012

Light novels
They were published by Shueisha under its Cobalt imprint starting in June 2007.

 , published 28 June 2007
 , published 1 August 2007
 , published 1 November 2007
 , published 26 December 2007
 , published 1 April 2008
 , published 2 September 2008 - This is an original story, and not an adaptation.

References

External links

List of Works at Shueisha
Profile at Shueisha
Kazune Kawahara in the natalie.mu

Anime character designers
Japanese graphic novelists
Japanese women illustrators
Living people
Women manga artists
Manga artists from Hokkaido
Japanese female comics artists
Female comics writers
Japanese women writers
1972 births